The Randolph Caldecott Medal, frequently shortened to just the Caldecott, annually recognizes the preceding year's "most distinguished American picture book for children". It is awarded to the illustrator by the Association for Library Service to Children (ALSC), a division of the American Library Association (ALA). The Caldecott and Newbery Medals are considered the most prestigious American children's book awards. Beside the Caldecott Medal, the committee awards a variable number of citations to runners-up they deem worthy, called the Caldecott Honor or Caldecott Honor Books.

The Caldecott Medal was first proposed by Frederic G. Melcher, in 1937. The award was named after English illustrator Randolph Caldecott. Unchanged since its founding, the medal, which is given to every winner, features two of Caldecott's illustrations. The awarding process has changed several times over the years, including in 1971 which began use of the term "Honor" for the runner-ups. There have been between one and five honor books named each year.

To be eligible for a Caldecott, the book must be published in English, in the United States first, and be drawn by an American illustrator. An award committee decides on a winner in January or February, voting using a multi-round point system. The committee judges books on several criteria to meet the Caldecott's goal of recognizing "distinguished illustrations in a picture book and for excellence of pictorial presentation for children."

Winning the award can lead to a substantial rise in books sold. It can also increase the prominence of illustrators. Illustrator and author Marcia Brown is the most recognized Caldecott illustrator having won three medals and having six honor books. In recent years, there has been an increase in the number of minority characters and illustrators recognized, however, this is something which has fluctuated over the history of the award.

History 
The Caldecott was suggested in 1937 by Frederic G. Melcher, former editor of Publishers Weekly, following the establishment of the Newbery Medal in 1921. The American Library Association adopted Melcher's suggestion of awarding a medal to the illustrator "who had created the most distinguished picture book of the year." According to children's literature expert Leonard S. Marcus, the award helped draw American artists into the field of children's books.

The award has been tweaked over the years, with the most recent changes in 2009. When the award was founded, books could be considered either for the Newbery or the Caldecott, with the same committee judging both awards. The committee noted other books of merit, which were frequently referred to as runner-ups. In 1971, these books were formally named Caldecott Honor books, with this name applied retroactively. In 1977 books became eligible for both awards and, beginning with the 1980 award, separate committees for each award were formed. Until 1958, a previous winner could win again only by unanimous vote of the committee, and in 1963 joint winners were first permitted.

Medal 

The award is named for Randolph Caldecott, a nineteenth-century English illustrator. Rene Paul Chambellan designed the Medal in 1937. The obverse scene is derived from Randolph Caldecott's front cover illustration for The Diverting History of John Gilpin (Routledge, 1878, an edition of the 1782 poem by William Cowper), which depicts John Gilpin astride a runaway horse. The reverse is based on "Four and twenty blackbirds baked in a pie", one of Caldecott's illustrations for the nursery rhyme "Sing a Song of Sixpence". 

Each illustrator receives a bronze copy of the medal, which, despite being awarded by the Association for Library Service to Children (ALSC), lists Children's Librarian's Section, the original awarding group, for historical reasons.

Eligibility and criteria

A picture book, according to the award criteria, provides "a visual experience. A picture book has a collective unity of story-line, theme, or concept, developed through the series of pictures" that constitute the book. The Medal is "for distinguished illustrations in a picture book and for excellence of pictorial presentation for children".  Specifically the illustrations are judged on their artistic technique, interpretation of the book's story and theme, the fit between the illustrations and the story and themes, the precision of depiction of elements of the book, like characters and mood, and how well the illustrations serve their targeted audience. Honor books need to fulfill the same criteria. The book must be self-contained, independent of other media for its enjoyment. Components other than illustration, including the book's text or overall design, may be considered as they affect the overall effectiveness of the book's illustrations.

To be eligible for the Caldecott, the artist must be a US citizen or resident, the book must have been published in English, in the United States first, or simultaneously in other countries. Picture books for any audience up to the age of 14 may be considered. In December 2019, children's literature expert Leonard S. Marcus suggested that the Caldecott had achieved its mission in the US and the award should be expanded so children's book illustrations from anywhere in the world be considered.

Selection process
The committee that decides on the Caldecott Award winner comprises fifteen members of ALSC. Seven members are elected by the entire ALSC membership and eight, including the chairperson, are appointed by the ALSC President. Members are chosen based on their experience and to ensure a diversity of libraries (e.g. public and school, small and large) and geographical areas are represented. Publishers send copies of books to the committee; 2009 members each received more than 700. However, a book does not need to be sent to the committee to be considered. Instead, to help identify possible contenders, committee members formally nominate seven books in three rounds over the year, and less formally recommend others.

At ALSC's annual midwinter meeting, held in late January or early February, the committee will discuss the nominations and hold a vote on the winner. When voting, committee members list their first place, second place, and third place selections. Each vote is assigned a point value, with first place votes receiving four points, second place three points, and third place two points. The winner must receive at least eight first place votes and be at least eight points ahead of the second-place finisher. After a winner is selected, the committee can decide whether to award any honor books. They may be chosen from runner-ups to the winner, or be selected in a separate ballot. The winner and honor books are kept secret until they are publicly announced, with the committee calling the winning illustrators the morning of the announcement.

In 2015, K. T. Horning of the University of Wisconsin–Madison's Cooperative Children's Book Center proposed to ALSC that old discussions of the Newbery and Caldecott be made public in the service of researchers and historians. This proposal was met with both support and criticism by former committee members and recognized authors.  no change has been made.

Impact and analysis 
The Caldecott and Newbery awards have historically been considered the most important children's book awards. Anita Silvey, children's book author, editor, and critic, suggests they might even be the most important book awards, saying that "no other award has the economic significance of the Newbery and Caldecott". According to Silvey, a Caldecott winner can have sales increased from 2,000 to 100,000–200,000. Silvey also credits the Caldecott for helping to establish Bradbury Press and Roaring Brook Press as important publishers. It can also be an important recognition for authors. According to Leonard Marcus, Where the Wild Things Ares recognition brought its author and illustrator, Maurice Sendak, to national prominence.

A 1999 study on the reading levels of Caldecott recipients suggested that most winners were written at the elementary age level, with the average reading level having decreased over time. A 2007 study of Caldecott recipients found that the prevalence and importance of female characters had risen and fallen several times over the history of the Caldecott. It also found that, unlike recipients of the Pura Belpré Award and Coretta Scott King Award, the behaviors of male and female characters remained distinct and adhered to traditional gender norms. A different 2007 study, by one of the same authors, also found an increase in the number of minority characters following a 1965 critique by Nancy Larrick, however the number of minorities had fallen by the 2000s. In recent years, there has been an increase in the number of minority characters and illustrators recognized. The Horn Book Magazine editor Martha Parravano has noted how rarely non-fiction books, especially non-fiction books about science, are recognized by the Caldecott.

Recipients

Multiple award winners 

Listed below are all illustrators who have won at least two Caldecott Medals or who have won a Medal and multiple honors.

See also 

 Kate Greenaway Medal, for illustration of a British children's book
 Theodor Seuss Geisel Award,  for  an American book for beginning readers

References

Citations

Further reading

 

 Smith, Irene (1957). A History of the Newbery and Caldecott Medals. New York: Viking Press.
 Ebook Central Academic Complete. In the Words of the Winners: The Newbery and Caldecott Medals, 2001–2010. Chicago: American Library Association, 2011.

External links

 

 
American children's literary awards
Awards established in 1938
American Library Association awards
1938 establishments in the United States
English-language literary awards
American literary awards